Duesenberg is a brand for electric string instruments founded in 1986 and located in Hannover, Germany. The headquarter is in Hannover, Germany, (some of the hardware is made by Gotoh which is manufactured in the far east) they are known for using a Plek machine for the levelling of frets and setup. The actual place for production of guitar bodies and necks have never been revealed by Duesenberg e.g. by showing a factory Tour video.

Duesenberg is part of Göldo Music GmbH and is widely known for their classic and distinctive Art Deco designs. By 2004, the company opened a new branch in Fullerton, California.

Besides its electric guitars and basses such as its most successful model, the Starplayer TV, the company produces high end music equipment like amplifiers and effects pedals.

History

When first used by the German guitar designer Dieter Gölsdorf in 1986, Duesenberg was originally a brand for futuristic heavy metal guitars until 1989.

Since 1991, Gölsdorf uses the brand within his company, Göldo Music GmbH in Hannover, Germany.
By 1995, Gölsdorf had begun developing a new guitar called the Starplayer, which would be the predecessor of their now most popular model, the Starplayer TV. The brand Duesenberg was taken up again for these instruments.
The guitar featured a semi-hollow flat Spruce top construction, a Maple neck with Rosewood fingerboard, two pickups, initially two humbuckers, later one humbucker and one P-90-style single coil switched by utilising unconventional wiring, and numerous Art Deco style appointments.
With its classic designs and mostly unconventional colouring, Duesenberg instruments refer to the craftsmanship in guitar design of the 1950s and 1960s.

Due to the extensive media coverage of Japanese popular musician Sheena Ringo, who regularly used a surf green Starplayer TV, sales figures began experiencing a steady growth.
In 2004, the company opened a new branch in Fullerton, California.
As sales continued growing, the company found itself in need of a new facility and moved from the city center to the outskirts of Hannover by 2011.
Meanwhile, the number of international artists who use Duesenberg instruments as live performance equipment has increased significantly. Over the years, this has resulted in several Signature-Edition Instruments.

Today, Duesenberg has become a small brand with worldwide recognition for high-quality instruments and sound equipment.

Name

Duesenberg is spelled the same as the automobile brand, founded in the 1920s by brothers Friedrich and August Duesenberg. They themselves had become highly respected for outstanding design, performance and luxury.
Just like the cars, Duesenberg instruments are also called Doozy or Duesy, which had become a slang expression for extravagance and enthusiasm in past decades, originally associated with the automobiles.
Rumor has it when Ron Wood, guitarist of The Rolling Stones, first unpacked his signature edition, the Ron Wood Mother Of Pearl in October 2002, he apparently said "Oh what a Doozey!", which may be the actual reason why Duesenberg Instruments came to be called Doozeys.

Design

A fundamental basis of the typical Duesenberg design is its three-step geometry. This is reflected in almost every part of the instrument, from headstock, pickguard and pickup-ring to knobs, output jack and even the pickup switch knob. The typical Duesenberg D also contains this three-step design in the lower bar.

Most of the instruments are semi-hollow constructions. However, the solid body guitars also feature many traditional elements.
Duesenberg combines these traditional shapes with design elements of the Art Déco style, which is expressed in overall designs, as well through the use of rare and eccentric materials. Typical for this style are parallel lines, stepped geometries and extended curves.

The colouring also uses classic elements, some of them typical for Art Déco. Besides standard colours such as Black and White, the colour palette features a transparent Orange, a classic Surf Green, a pastel Red and the glitter finishes Blue-, Silver- and Black-sparkle. Duesenberg designs also feature extravagant mother-of-pearl finishes Ice-, Blue- and Emerald-Green-Pearl.
Traditional finishes such as Gold-Top, Two-Tone-Sunburst, Fireburst and Vintage Blonde are used on specific models as well.

Features

Wood & Neck
Spruce is the traditional German choice wood for the tops of semi-hollow constructed instruments – this also is reflected in Duesenberg instruments. The back, bent sides and neck on these models usually are made of Maple which in the case of sides and back is flamed and bookmatched.

Most models feature a neck made of American Hardrock Maple. Exceptions are the D-Caster, Dragster, 49er and 52, which are equipped with a Mahogany neck. These guitars also feature a Mahogany body.

The fretboards are made of Indian Rosewood with dot-inlays for orientation, except for the Starplayer TV Phonic, Artist-, 440-, Classic- and Imperial Series as well as the signature models Starplayer TV Chris Whitley and C.C. John Platania, which have custom fretboard inlays.
Each guitar features a 25.6" scale, a fretboard radius of 12" and a Dual-Action-Trussrod. All guitars are equipped with Jumbo Frets and factory-fitted .10-.50 strings.

Hardware
Every instrument features Duesenberg's own hardware parts which are designed by Dieter Gölsdorf. Due to the classic approach, all standard hardware parts are nickel-plated, as was customary before chrome finishes became popular.
Hardware parts are being constantly developed and improved so that the current tremolo on Duesenberg guitars have been optimized in shape and detail continuously until today.

Duesenberg uses their own tuners, called Z-Tuners, on every guitar. These tuners have a drilled-through shaft which allows for fast string change by putting the string all the way through the tuner and cutting it off at the end to prevent sharp ends sticking out at the back of the headstock.

Pickups
As well as other hardware, Duesenberg pickups are available online.
Each pickup features an open German Silver cover.
Currently, the company produces five different types of pickups for neck or bridge position use.
The Grand Vintage, the Crunchbucker and the D-Tron generally cover the area of humbucking pickups. The Grand Vintage is Duesenberg's interpretation of a classic PAF Style pickup and is used in most instruments bridge position.
The Little Toaster is a humbucking pickup with a lower output reminiscent more of a single coil than a Humbucker and is featured on special instruments such as the TV Rebound.
The Domino is a P90 style pickup with the dimensions of a standard humbucker. It is used in the neck position on most guitars.

PLEK
Since January 2009, every instrument has been processed in the computer-controlled PLEK machine.
The CNC based system cuts and levels each fret within a tolerance of 1/100 of a millimetre. This is done to guarantee optimal setup conditions and playability.

Starplayer TV

The Starplayer TV, often simply referred to as TV, is a semi-hollow electric guitar, featuring a sustain-center-block, maple neck and arched back, as well as a laminated arched spruce top with a single f-hole on the left side.
The standard version of the Starplayer TV is equipped with two pickups, the Domino P90 in the neck position and the Grand Vintage humbucker in the bridge position. The tremolo versions of the guitar use the Duesenberg Diamond Deluxe Tremola as designed by Dieter Gölsdorf.
Depending on the version, every guitar has a distinctive top finish. Neck, sides and reverse of the headstock are usually finished in opaque black. Basic versions feature a black to grey burst finish on the back, decently showing the flamed maple. Most models have a simple cream binding on body and neck.

Over the years, the Starplayer TV has become the company's most successful model within the range, which has resulted in several special versions and signature models:

Starplayer TV
Basic model, available in Black, Vintage White, 2-Tone Sunburst, Surf Green, Silver Sparkle, Blue Sparkle, Trans-Orange and Gold-Top.
Starplayer TV Stoptailpiece
Edition without a tremolo, available in Black and 2-Tone Sunburst.
Starplayer TV Classic (Honey All Over)
Special Edition featuring the Honey-All-Over finish. Unlike the basic versions, this model has a complete honey finish, including back, sides and neck. The fretboard has oval inlays and the body has a deluxe 5-layer binding as well as a custom black pickguard.
Starplayer TV Rebound
Special Edition in cooperation with German musician Wolfgang Niedecken and his Rebound Project, which aims to reintegrate former child soldiers and rape victims in the eastern Congolese town of Beni.
The guitar features a Fireburst finish, a black pickguard, two toaster pickups and three crown inlays on the headstock. The Starplayer TV Rebound is also available without a tremolo.
Starplayer TV Plus
Includes a shiftable Piezo pickup in the bridge and a stainless steel pickguard. Available in Black and Vintage White.
Starplayer TV Outlaw
Features Skai Leather covering on body and headstock, as well as a nickel-plated pickguard.
Starplayer TV Pearl
Special Version featuring a Mother-of-Pearl mosaic on the guitars top and headstock, as well as a nickel-plated pickguard. The Pearl series is available in Ice-, Blue- and Emerald-Green-Pearl.
Starplayer TV Custom
Featuring gold-plated hardware, a five-layer binding on the body and three D-Tron Humbucker Pickups. The middle pickup can be blended in any position using the multi tone pot.
Starplayer TV Mike Campbell
Signature Edition for Mike Campbell on the occasion of the 30-year anniversary of Tom Petty & The Heartbreakers. The Starplayer TV Mike Campbell features a special blue and white Rally finish and a nickel-plated pickguard with Mike Campbell’s lasered in signature.
Rumour has it that before the version became the Mike Campbell signature, it was planned to be the Starplayer TV Shelby, referring to the paintwork of the legendary sportscar Shelby Cobra.
Starplayer TV Chris Whitley
Signature Edition for American musician Chris Whitley. The guitar features a special transparent red finish, a fretboard with custom Mother-of-Pearl block inlays and a Piezo pickup in the bridge.
Starplayer TV Ron Wood
Signature Edition for Rolling Stones member Ron Wood featuring a real Mother-of-Pearl mosaic overlay with a yellow finish on the guitars top and headstock. It is equipped with a nickel-plated pickguard carrying Ron Wood’s lasered in signature.
The Starplayer TV Ron Wood was limited to 100 instruments and quickly became a collector’s item. It was the predecessor of the current Pearl editions.

List of Duesenberg Instruments

Semi-Hollow and Full-Hollow-body Guitars

Starplayer TV
See chapter Starplayer TV
Starplayer III
Re-issue of the original Starplayer guitar. While the Starplayer III is equipped with the same hardware as the Starplayer TV, it features a flat spruce top and flat maple back. It has a five-layer binding on the body and is available in Black and Champagne Sparkle.
Starplayer V
Is almost the same guitar as "Starplayer III", with the same features, is a model sold only in Japan.
C.C.
Flat full size semi hollow body with laminated spruce top and maple back. Configuration identical to the Starplayer TV. Has a C.C. application on the top and is available in black, 2-tone sunburst, trans-orange and vintage white.
There is also a signature edition for American musician John Platania. The C.C. John Platania features the same transparent-red finish, block-inlays on the fretboard and Piezo bridge as the Starplayer TV Chris Whitley, making the C.C. John Platania the full size equivalent of the TV Chris Whitley.
Fullerton
The Fullerton Series features the Starplayer TV and the C.C. as double cutaway versions in vintage white. Configuration is identical to the standard versions.
Fullerton Hollow
The Fullerton Hollow has the same shape as the Fullerton C.C., however, it is a full-hollow-body construction without center-block. It is equipped with a special Duesenberg Tailpiece and two Duesenberg P90 Pickups.
Imperial
Big Full-Size Hollow Body. It features a Domino P90 at the neck and a Grand Vintage at the bridge position. The black version is also available with two D-Tron Humbuckers. The Imperial comes with two F-holes on the top, a transparent pickguard, a mid-shift pot and oval fretboard inlays. Available in Red Burst, Light-Orange and Black.
The 440
Equipped and shaped the same way as the C.C but without a tremolo system. It features oval fretboard inlays just like the imperial and a 440 application on the top. Available in Black and Natural.
The 52
Mahogany body with sound chambers and a set in mahogany neck. Arched maple top, brass wrap-around tailpiece, single pickup in a special 3-point dog-ear nickel-silver housing in bridge position (optional Domino P90 or Little Toaster). Despite the guitar having only one pickup, the special wiring allows the creation of three different types of sound.
Available only in Gold-Top finish.
Double Cat
Semi-Hollow, sound chambered, double-cutaway construction with Cat-Eye F-Hole. The Double Cat features an alder body and a maple top. Equipped identically to the Starplayer TV but with the short Version of the Duesenberg Tremola. Also available a 12-string, or multi-bender version. Finishes include Black and Fireburst.
Caribou
Solid alder with routed extra large sound chambers. These sound chambers give the Caribou a uniquely direct, yet open voice that feels at home in any genre.
Duesenberg Cat-Eye F-Hole and an award winning set of pickups. Very briefly introduced as a 3 pickup model which was discontinued. Also had a model with a wrap around bridge.

Solid body Guitars
Starplayer Special
Bolt-on neck, alder body, a Grand Vintage humbucker in the neck- and a Crunchbucker  in the bridge position. The Starplayer Special, which was originally one of the first Duesenberg instruments featuring the Art-Déco style, is available in Black, Vintage White, Blue Sparkle, Silver Sparkle, Black Sparkle, Fiesta Red and Orange.
The 49er
1-piece mahogany neck in combination with a mahogany body with arched solid maple top cap, Domino P90 in the neck- and the Grand Vintage Humbucker in the bridge position. The 49er features an adjustable String-Through-Body system and is available in Black, Gold-Top, Outlaw, Blue-Pearloid and Honey.
Dragster
Set mahogany neck and flat top mahogany body. The guitar is equipped with a wrap-around tailpiece and a single Domino P90 pickup in a special 3-point dog-ear nickel-silver housing in bridge position, which is controlled by a 3-way switch. Despite the guitar having only one pickup, the special wiring allows for three different types of sound.
The guitar is available in two versions: Single Cutaway (colours: Vintage Sunburst and Vintage Blonde) and Double Cutaway (colours: Cherry Red and Oil & Wax)
Duesenberg also created a signature edition of the Dragster for American guitarist Peter Stroud, which is equipped with two pickups and the Duesenberg Multi Bender System. The Peter Stroud Dragster comes in Cream White.
D-Caster
Double-Cutaway design with optional pickup configurations, set maple neck, mahogany body, String-Through-Body system and custom Swell-Pot wiring.
Available in Black, Vintage White and Lake Placid Blue.
V-Caster
Single-Cutaway design featuring three Singlecoil pickups with humbucker dimensions.
Discontinued.
Rocket II
Modification of the classic Flying-V shape. The Rocket II has an asymmetrical body and is available in Black with, or without tremolo.

Special Instruments

Rezobro
Semi-Hollow construction based on the design of the Starplayer III. A special resonating bridge construction allows to create Dobro/Resonator sounds while being able to blend it with standard magnetic pickups. The Rezobro also features an adjustable nut for slide/bottleneck use.
The guitar is available in Black, Vintage White and 2-Tone Sunburst.
Baritone D6
Baritone Model based on the Starplayer Special construction but with a 28" scale. Grand Vintage Pickup in the neck-, Crunchbucker in the bridge position.
Available in Black Sparkle.
Pomona6 Lapsteel
Electrified realisation of the Lapsteel design, which is equipped with the Multi-Bender-System to create pedal steel type sounds. The Pomona6 features a movable capo, two Little Toaster pickups and a Speed-Pot tone control.
Mandola
Mandolin sized 12-String guitar with pitched octave. 15.35" scale, equipped with Duesenberg Singlecoil pickup in the neck- and Little Toaster in the bridge position.

Artist Series
Dave Stewart Blackbird Signature
Special limited edition of 52 pieces for US based British musician, ex-Eurythmic and studio producer Dave Stewart.
The Blackbird is based on the Starplayer III construction featuring silver-plated hardware, Custom-Three-Step fretboard inlays, an aluminium Stop-Tailpiece and a graphic on the top designed by Dave Stewart himself.

Basses
D-Bass
Solid alder body, 34" longscale, Mid-Shape control pot, Toaster Bass pickup. Available as 4 or 5-string version in Black, Sonoma Red or Lake Placid Blue.
Starplayer Bass
Semi-Hollow 4-string model based on the body design of the Starplayer TV. The Bass features a 30.3" medium scale and two Duesenberg Bass Humbucker.
Available in Black, Trans-Orange, 2-Tone Sunburst, Outlaw and Champaign Sparkle.: Additionally, the Starplayer Bass is available as Mike Campbell Signature Edition with the same blue and white rally finish as the Starplayer TV Mike Campbell.
Violin Bass
Duesenberg’s Interpretation of the classic Violin Bass design, 4-string version, 30.3" medium scale, one or two Bass Humbucker. Back and sides are made of flamed maple, the top is made of laminated spruce, no sustain-block. Available in Black and 2-Tone Sunburst.

Duesenberg Effect Pedals

Currently, Duesenberg offers a small range of high quality effect pedals.
The range includes the White Drive II (Overdrive), the Blue Move (Chorus), the Red Echo II (Delay), the Green Comp II (Compressor), the Violet Trem (Tremolo) and the Gold Boost.
All effects are hand wired in Germany, fully analogue and feature a True-Bypass circuit.

Duesenberg Amplifiers
Just as with the guitars and basses, the design for the amplifiers is influenced by the Art Déco style. The amplifiers are hand wired and an all-valve design, combined with modern components. The so-called Doozy amplifier is available in two versions:

Doozy One
20 Watts Class A/B Guitar Amp Combo featuring an integrated 12" Eminence Speaker.
All-Valve pre- and power-amp, Spring Reverb and 3-Band tone control.
Doozy Two
110 Watts Class A/B Guitar Amp with 2x12" Cabinet featuring two Eminence Red Coat Governor speakers.
2-channel all-valve amplifier with extra gain-stage for the second channel. 3-Band tone control and 55 Watts Half-Power-Switch. Serial-Effects-Loop for each channel.

Musicians 
The following is a list of some artists that use/have used Duesenberg instruments:

 Ken Casey of Dropkick Murphys
 Jeff DaRosa of Dropkick Murphys 
 Nancy Wilson of Heart
 Liam Finn 
 Jason Isbell 
 Ron Wood 
 Sascha Paeth 
 Sheena Ringo 
 Mike Campbell 
 John Mayer 
 Bob Dylan 
 Billy Gibbons 
 Robbie McIntosh 
 Paul McCartney 
 Ryan McGarvey
 Peter Stroud 
 Brian Ray 
 Planetshakers 
 The Eagles  
 Joe Walsh 
 Keith Richards 
 Slash
 Jon Bon Jovi
 Richie Sambora 
 Kenny Loggins 
 Rod Stewart 
 Pearl Jam 
 Keb Mo  
 Vince Gill
 Chris Cornell  
 John Mellencamp  
 Keith Urban 
 Bobby Bandiera 
 Chris Rodriguez  
 Duff McKagan 
 Jedd Hughes  
 Electric Light Orchestra
 Faith Hill 
 The Kooks  
 The Strokes  
 Carrie Underwood  
 Elvis Costello  
 JJ Cale  
 Goo Goo Dolls 
 Chris Spedding  
 Colin Hay   
 Marc Ford 
 Rascal Flatts  
 Taj Mahal 
 Tony Joe White   
 Jack Ingram 
 Mike McCready 
 MercyMe 
 Tito & Tarantula 
 Bloodhound Gang 
 Elli Erl 
 Jeremy Camp 
 The Black Crows 
 Stephen Duffy 
 Cyril Roger
 Hillsong United 
 Hillsong Worship 
 Generación 12
 Johnny Depp 
 Polkadot Stingray 
 The Immigrants 
 Yang Jiwan
 Juan Sebantián Mora

In popular culture 
The fictional character I-No from the fighting video game franchise Guilty Gear is officially (canonically by the series' lore) using a direct copy of Duesenberg's "Starplayer II" guitar model as her primary (blunt) weapon of choice. Visual presentation-wise it's a direct replica of the actual "Starplayer TV" model, albeit made with reinforced materials (such as titanium and space flight-grade aluminum) to withstand heavy impacts such as when I-No is hitting her opponents, directly smashes her guitar against the ground, etc.

References

External links 

 

Guitar manufacturing companies
Bass guitar manufacturing companies
Musical instrument manufacturing companies of Germany
Manufacturing companies based in Hanover